The Messa per Rossini is a Requiem Mass composed to commemorate the first anniversary of Gioachino Rossini's death. It was a collaboration among 13 Italian composers, initiated by Giuseppe Verdi. The composition was intended to be performed on 13 November 1869 in the Basilica of San Petronio, Bologna, where Rossini grew up and spent a large part of his life.

Composition history
Verdi had proposed this collaboration in a letter from 17 November 1868, four days after Rossini's death, to his publisher at Casa Ricordi,  (1811–1888), stating that after the performance, the manuscripts should be sealed in the archives of the Liceo musicale Rossini.

The city council of Bologna and the Accademia Filarmonica di Bologna received this idea favourably and a committee of three members (Lauro Rossi, Alberto Mazzucato, Stefano Ronchetti-Monteviti) of the Milan Conservatory was established in Milan with Giulio Ricordi as secretary. The committee chose the composers and assigned their tasks; Angelo Mariani agreed to conduct.

Mariani was also involved in Rossini commemorations in Pesaro, Rossini's birthplace, which were planned for August 1869. Despite Mariani's pleading invitation to Verdi on 19 August 1869, Verdi replied on the same day indignantly that he would not attend. In a letter from 24 August, Mariani expressed his distress at that response. Meanwhile, the committee had asked the impresario of the Teatro Comunale di Bologna, Luigi Scalaberni (1823–1876), to lend the performers, orchestra and chorus for the performance in Bologna on 13 November. Scalaberni refused on 6 October for commercial reasons because the performance of the mass would impede the success of his opera season. The municipal authorities then suggested to defer the commemorations until December, after the opera season. Verdi objected to such a delay and also to a suggestion by the committee to relocate the performance to Milan. In a letter from 27 October 1869 to Ricordi, Verdi rails against delay or relocation, and not only blames Mariani for the situation, but remarks: "Who would be the conductor at Milan? It cannot and must not be Mariani." The performance of the composition, which was finished by the summer of 1869, was then cancelled. The manuscript subsequently fell into oblivion.

Giuseppe Verdi adapted his own contribution, the concluding Libera me, as the basis for that section when composing his own Messa da Requiem.

Performance history
The complete Messa per Rossini was discovered by American musicologist David Rosen in 1970 and premiered in 1988 by the Gächinger Kantorei conducted by Helmuth Rilling at the European Music Festival in Stuttgart and later at other festivals, such as the Rheingau Musik Festival in 2001. The first performance in the United States took place in October 1989 in New York at Avery Fisher Hall, also conducted by Rilling, with the soprano Gabriela Beňačková, the mezzo Cornelia Kallisch, the tenor James Wagner, the baritone Jacob Will and the bass Brian Matthews, the Gächinger Kantorei and the New York Philharmonic. The work has subsequently been recorded on CD. The first performance in France takes place in 1998 at the Radio France-Montpellier Festival in Montpellier, under the direction of Enrique Diemecke, with the soprano Luana DeVol, the mezzo-soprano Phyllis Pancella, the tenor Rockwell Blake, the baritone Stefano Antonucci, the bass Felipe Bou, the Latvian Radio Choir and the Montpellier-Languedoc-Roussillon Philharmonic Orchestra. The first performance in the United Kingdom was given in 2003 at the Royal Academy of Music (London) by the Trinity Chorale and Trinity Orchestra, conducted by John Wyatt (Director of Music, Aldenham School). In November 2017, Riccardo Chailly conducted this Requiem in concerts at the Teatro alla Scala in Milan. On 9 December 2017, after 148 years and a month, the Requiem was finally performed in the Basilica of San Petronio in Bologna, the place Giuseppe Verdi originally had in mind for this work. Organized and created by "Succede solo a Bologna APS", Lorenzo Bizzarri conducted the Cappella Musicale di Santa Maria dei Servi (orchestra and choir) and the Corale Quadriclavio, both from Bologna.

Scoring
 soloists: soprano, alto, tenor, baritone, bass
 mixed chorus (4 to 6 voices)
 orchestra: piccolo, 2 flutes, 2 oboes, English horn, 2 clarinets, bass clarinet, 4 bassoons, 4 horns, 4 trumpets, 3 trombones, ophicleide, 4 timpani, bass drum, cymbals, tam-tam, organ, strings (including divisi and solo)

Structure of the work and contributors

Recordings

References

Further reading

Prinz, Ulrich (1989): A Commentary on Messa per Rossini. English translation by Roger Clément. CD booklet Hänssler classic 98.949. Neuhausen-Stuttgart: Hänssler.
Scherer, Barrymore L. (1989): "Music; When Verdi Spoke, Everyone Listened", The New York Times

1869 compositions
Collaborations in classical music
Compositions by Giuseppe Verdi
Music for orchestra and organ
Requiem Masses
Gioachino Rossini